Jonathan Coleclough / Bass Communion / Colin Potter is a collaboration with drone artists Jonathan Coleclough and Colin Potter that grew out of the Bass Communion remix project. It was originally limited to 500 copies with a second edition of 500 copies being issued in January 2005 and a third edition being issued in Fall 2022.

The first CD contained four pieces of textural and spectral music, but with movement and variation. In contrast the second disc contains one long piece based on only two sound sources taken from Bass Communion's Drugged.

Track listing
CD One
"Passed"  Sources: Bass Communion | Mix: Potter - 12:53
"Yossaria"  Sources: Potter & Coleclough | Mix: Bass Communion - 24:13
"Raiser"  Sources: Bass Communion | Mix: Potter - 8:48
"Pethidine"  Sources Bass Communion & Coleclough | Mix: Coleclough - 27:51

CD Two
"Epidural"  Sources: Bass Communion | Mix: Coleclough - 73:57

Credits
Cover by Jonathan Coleclough

References

External links
Bass Communion Site at Steven Wilson Headquarters

Bass Communion albums
1999 remix albums